Niceto Pérez is a municipality and town in the Guantánamo Province of Cuba.

Demographics
In 2004, the municipality of Niceto Pérez had a population of 17,783.

See also
List of cities in Cuba
Municipalities of Cuba

References

External links

Populated places in Guantánamo Province